Koldun may refer to:
 Dmitry Koldun (born 1985), Belarusian pop singer
 Koldun, Iran, a village in Isfahan Province, Iran
 Russian monitor Koldun, a Russian Uragan-class monitor
 Koldun (album)